Hoseynabad (also Romanized as Ḩoseynābād; also known as Ḩasanābād, Ḩoseynābād Sheybānī-ye Kavīr, and Husainābād) is a village in Kavir Rural District, Kavirat District, Aran va Bidgol County, Isfahan Province, Iran. At the 2006 census, its population was 1,686, in 440 families.

References 

Populated places in Aran va Bidgol County